Douglas William Hansen (December 16, 1928 – September 16, 1999) was an American professional baseball player whose career extended from 1947–1951, 1953–1954 and 1956.  All but three games of his 728-game professional career were in minor league baseball. He appeared in three Major League contests as a pinch runner for the  Cleveland Indians and scored two runs.

Hansen was an infielder by trade. In September 1950, he made his three pinch-running appearances for Cleveland. In his first game, an extra-inning contest against the Chicago White Sox on September 4, he pinch run for Indians pitcher Early Wynn — who had reached base as a pinch hitter. Hansen failed to score as Chicago won, 3–1. In his next two appearances, on September 7 and 11, each time running for veteran catcher Birdie Tebbetts, Hansen scored his two MLB runs.

References

External links

1928 births
1999 deaths
Baseball players from California
Buffalo Bisons (minor league) players
Cleveland Indians players
Dallas Eagles players
El Paso Texans players
Harrisburg Senators players
Indianapolis Indians players
Little Rock Travelers players
Reading Indians players
San Diego Padres (minor league) players
Visalia Cubs players
Wilkes-Barre Indians players
John C. Fremont High School alumni